Roustabout is a 1964 American musical feature film starring Elvis Presley as a singer who takes a job working with a struggling carnival. The film was produced by Hal Wallis and directed by John Rich from a screenplay by Anthony Lawrence and Allan Weiss. The screenplay was nominated for a Writers Guild of America award for best written American musical although Roustabout received a lukewarm review in Variety. The film's soundtrack album was one of Elvis Presley's most successful, reaching no. 1 on the Billboard Album Chart.
It was filmed in Techniscope at Paramount Studios with location for carnival sequences shot in Thousand Oaks, California. Filming began in March 1964.

Plot

Musician Charlie Rogers is fired from a job at a teahouse after brawling with several college students in the parking lot. After a night in jail, Charlie hits the road on his Honda 305 Superhawk motorcycle. He spots Cathy Lean driving with her father Joe, and their employer, Maggie Morgan. When Charlie tries to become friendly with Cathy, Joe forces him off the road and the bike is wrecked after crashing into a wooden fence.

Maggie offers him a place to stay and a job with her struggling traveling carnival while the bike is being repaired. Charlie becomes a "carnie", a roustabout. Maggie recognizes his musical talents and promotes him to feature attraction. His act soon draws large crowds. Off stage, Charlie romances Cathy, which creates animosity with Joe. After the two men repeatedly clash and Charlie is accused of holding back a customer's lost wallet that Joe was accused of stealing, Charlie leaves to star in the much better financed show of rival carnival producer Harry Carver.

Once again, he is a great success. However, when Charlie learns that Maggie is facing bankruptcy, he returns to her carnival. In the musical finale, he is happily reunited with Cathy.

Cast
Elvis Presley as Charlie Rogers
Barbara Stanwyck as Maggie Morgan
Joan Freeman as Cathy Lean
Leif Erickson as Joe Lean
Jack Albertson as Lou, a teahouse manager
Sue Ane Langdon as Madame Mijanou, a fortune teller
Pat Buttram as Harry Carver
Joan Staley as Marge
Dabbs Greer as Arthur Nielsen
Steve Brodie as Fred the Pitcher
Norman Grabowski as Sam
Lynn Borden as a college student
Jane Dulo as Hazel
Joel Fluellen as Cody Marsh, another roustabout
Wilda Taylor as Little Egypt, the principal dancer in the number "Little Egypt"

Uncredited actors listed alphabetically:
Beverly Adams as Cora, a dancer
Billy Barty as Billy, carnival midget
Teri Garr as College Girl. Garr can also be seen as a backup dancer during several musical numbers.
Joy Harmon as College Girl
Richard Kiel as Strongman. Kiel is better known for playing "Jaws" in the James Bond movies The Spy Who Loved Me (1977) and Moonraker (1979)
Kent McCord as Carnival Worker
Raquel Welch as College Girl
Red West as Carnival Worker

Musical numbers
See also Roustabout (soundtrack)

"Roustabout" by Bill Giant, Bernie Baum and Florence Kaye
"Poison Ivy League" by Bill Giant, Bernie Baum and Florence Kaye
"One Track Heart" by Bill Giant, Bernie Baum and Florence Kaye
"Wheels On My Heels" by Sid Tepper and Roy C. Bennett
"It's a Wonderful World" by Sid Tepper and Roy C. Bennett
"It's Carnival Time" by Ben Weisman and Sid Wayne
"Carny Town" by Fred Wise and Randy Starr
"Hard Knocks" by Joy Byers
"There's a Brand New Day On the Horizon" by Joy Byers
"Big Love, Big Heartache" by Dolores Fuller, Lee Morris and Sonny Hendrix
"Little Egypt" by Jerry Leiber and Mike Stoller
"I'm A Roustabout" by Otis Blackwell and Winfield Scott, a different and unreleased theme song for the movie

All tunes in the film were sung by Presley.

Reception

Roustabout reached #8 nationally at the box office in 1964 based on the Variety survey. The film finished as #28 on the year-end list of the top-grossing movies of 1964 and earned $3 million at the box office.

The New York Times writer Howard Thompson complained about "little in the way of dramatic substance" and that the movie wasn't "nearly so trim a package" as Fun in Acapulco or Viva Las Vegas, but noted that Elvis was "perfectly cast" and "surprisingly convincing in his role." Variety was lukewarm, faulting mainly a script "loaded with clichés", but noted the film would likely be a box-office hit based upon its star names, songs, and "Technicolor, Techniscope frame." John L. Scott of the Los Angeles Times called the film "a trite, cliche-ridden story that has been thrown together to showcase Elvis Presley and his vocalizing. It serves its purpose well, and probably will prove a box office bonanza for producer Hal Wallis." The Monthly Film Bulletin wrote, "Presley vehicles have sadly deteriorated since the days of Follow That Dream, and this amiable but uninspiring piece does nothing to halt the process, despite curiosity value provided by Barbra Stanwyck, back with Paramount for the first time in ten years."

Awards and honors
The film's screenwriters, Anthony Lawrence and Allan Weiss, were nominated for the Writers Guild of America Award for Best Written American Musical. The film generated a best-selling soundtrack album that went #1 on the Billboard charts. The soundtrack album would be Presley's final #1 soundtrack and last #1 album until 1969's From Elvis in Memphis, which topped the charts in the U.K.

References

External links

 
 
 
 

1964 films
1960s romantic musical films
American musical drama films
American romantic drama films
American romantic musical films
Circus films
Films directed by John Rich
Films produced by Hal B. Wallis
Films shot in California
Paramount Pictures films
1960s English-language films
1960s American films